The School for Sons-in-law was an 1897 French short silent film by Georges Méliès. It was inspired by a vaudeville (in the sense of a light stage comedy) by Eugène Bertol-Graivil, a French playwright whose real name was Eugène Domicent (1857–1910).

The School for Sons-in-law was filmed outdoors in the garden of the Méliès family property in Montreuil-sous-Bois, with painted scenery; many parts of the set were reused in other films. It was sold by Méliès's Star Film Company and is numbered 102 in its catalogues, but is currently presumed lost.

References

External links
 

French black-and-white films
Films directed by Georges Méliès
French silent short films
Lost French films
1890s lost films
1897 short films
1890s French films
French films based on plays
Films shot in France